The Basilica of Our Lady of the Pillar in Recoleta, Buenos Aires was built as part of the Franciscan monastery, completed in 1732 and dedicated to Our Lady of the Pillar.
It is the second-oldest church in Buenos Aires, and has served as a parish church following the expulsion of the Franciscans in 1821.

Its construction was begun by Italian Jesuit architect  Andrés Blanqui and finished under Juan Bautista Prímoli.

References

 
 Miguel Cabrera, Guía de Iglesias de Buenos Aires (2010)
 Carlos Vigil,  Los Monumentos y lugares históricos de la Argentina  (1968)
 Santiago Sebastián López. Arte iberoamericano desde la colonización a la independencia, segunda parte. Summa Artis. Historia general del arte. Vol. XXIX. Espasa Calpe, Madrid 1985. 

Roman Catholic churches in Buenos Aires
Roman Catholic churches completed in 1732
18th-century Roman Catholic church buildings in Argentina
Baroque church buildings in Argentina